Dimitar Drazhev (15 September 1924 – 16 February 2014) was a Bulgarian alpine skier. He has competed at the 1948 Winter Olympics and the 1952 Winter Olympics. He was one of the alpine ski sport pioneers in Bulgaria. He became chairman of the Bulgarian Ski Federation in 1946 and after completing his higher education in Moscow was reelected as chairman from 1956 to 1962. He later served as committee member representing Bulgaria in the International Ski Federation and dean of the ski faculty at the National Sports Academy "Vassil Levski". He is the father of alpine skier Vladimir Drazhev and the grandfather of the figure skater Hristina Vassileva.

References

Olympic alpine skiers of Bulgaria
Bulgarian male alpine skiers
Alpine skiers at the 1948 Winter Olympics
Alpine skiers at the 1952 Winter Olympics
1924 births
2014 deaths
People from Samokov
Sportspeople from Sofia Province